Rumble in the South EP is an EP by The Wedding and was released in 2005. This five track release has three brand new songs and acoustic versions of the first two tracks from their self-titled album.

Track listing
 "Southside" (4:18)
 "Rebound" (3:26)
 "Ode to Fayetteville" (2:45)
 "Morning Air (Acoustic Version)" (4:33)
 "Move This City (Acoustic Version)" (3:09)

2005 EPs
The Wedding (band) albums